The 2014 IFA Shield was the 118th edition of the IFA Shield. The tournament was held from 29 January to 11 February 2014 in Kolkata. That year, the Indian Football Association announced that three foreign clubs to participate in the tournament, S.League club Geylang International FC, South Korean Sun Moon University and Bangladesh Premier League club Sheikh Jamal Dhanmondi Club.

However on 22 January 2014 it was announced that Shillong Lajong would not participate in this tournament and instead current I-League 2nd Division club United Sikkim would take their place.

Group stage

Group A

Group B

Semi-finals

Third-place match

Final

Goalscorers
4 Goals
  Sony Norde (Sheikh Jamal)

3 Goals
  Wedson Anselme (Sheikh Jamal)

2 Goals
  James Moga (East Bengal)
  Emeka Darlington (Sheikh Jamal)
  Oluwaunmi Somide (United Sikkim)
  Chidi Edeh (East Bengal)
  Baldeep Singh (United)

1 Goal
  Seminlen Doungel (East Bengal)
  Lalrindika Ralte (East Bengal)
  Kim Dae-han (Sun Moon University)
  Kim Jong-woo (Sun Moon University)
  Kento Fukuda (Geylang International)
  Mohammed Rafique (United)
  Ranti Martins (United)
  Eric Brown (United)
  Rakesh Masih (Mohammedan)
  Ashim Biswas (Mohammedan)
  Josimar (Mohammedan)
  Chinadorai Sabeeth (Mohun Bagan)
  Penn Orji (Mohammedan)
  Mehrajuddin Wadoo (Mohammedan)

References 

IFA Shield seasons
Ifa Shield
Ifa Shield